Capitophorus is a genus of aphids in the family Aphididae. There are more than 30 described species in Capitophorus.

Species
These 32 species belong to the genus Capitophorus:

 Capitophorus archangelskii Nevsky, 1928
 Capitophorus bulgaricus Tashev, 1964
 Capitophorus carduinus (Walker, 1850)
 Capitophorus cirsiiphagus Takahashi, 1961
 Capitophorus elaeagni (Del Guercio, 1894) (artichoke aphid)
 Capitophorus eniwanus Miyazaki, 1971
 Capitophorus essigi Hille Ris Lambers, 1953
 Capitophorus evelaeagni Zhang, 1980
 Capitophorus formosartemisiae (Takahashi, 1921)
 Capitophorus gnathalifoliae Shinji, 1924
 Capitophorus himachali Chakrabarti & Maity, 1980
 Capitophorus himalayensis Ghosh, Ghosh & Raychaudhuri, 1971
 Capitophorus hippophaes (Walker, 1852) (polygonum aphid)
 Capitophorus horni Börner, 1931
 Capitophorus hudsonicus Robinson, 1979
 Capitophorus inulae (Passerini, 1860)
 Capitophorus jopepperi Corpuz-Raros & Cook, 1974
 Capitophorus litanensis
 Capitophorus meghalayensis Basu & Raychaudhuri, 1976
 Capitophorus mitegoni Eastop, 1956
 Capitophorus montanus Takahashi, 1921
 Capitophorus pakansus Hottes & Frison, 1931
 Capitophorus prunifoliae Shinji, 1924
 Capitophorus rhamnoides Zhang, Chen, Zhong & Li, 1999
 Capitophorus rostratus
 Capitophorus shepherdiae Gillette & Bragg, 1916
 Capitophorus similis van der Goot, 1915
 Capitophorus takahashii Strand, 1925
 Capitophorus theobaldi
 Capitophorus tricholepidis Chakrabarti, 1976
 Capitophorus wojciechowskii Wieczorek & Kanturski, 2015
 Capitophorus xanthii (Oestlund, 1886)

References

Further reading

 
 
 

Articles created by Qbugbot
Sternorrhyncha genera
Macrosiphini